Ninja Warrior may refer to:

Film
 Lone Ninja Warrior (1983 film), a Taiwanese wuxia film

Television
Sasuke (TV series) (also shown as Ninja Warrior), a Japanese television show based around an obstacle course.
Kunoichi (TV series) (Women of Ninja Warrior), a TV show spun-off from Sasuke, featuring exclusively female competitors.
Sasuke Ninja Warrior Indonesia, an Indonesian adaptation of Sasuke's format.
American Ninja Warrior, an American variation of Sasuke that began as a qualifier to compete on Sasuke.
Team Ninja Warrior, a spin-off of American Ninja Warrior focused on team competition.
Ninja Warrior UK, a British adaptation of the Ninja Warrior format.
Australian Ninja Warrior, an Australian adaptation of the Ninja Warrior format.
 Ninja Warrior Germany, a German adaptation of the Ninja Warrior format.

Video games
The Ninja Warriors (1987 video game), a beat 'em up game for arcades.
The Ninja Warriors (1994 video game), a beat 'em up game for the Super NES. It is a sequel/remake to the 1987 game.

Other uses
Ninja, shinobi and kunoichi, the martial artist warriors.

See also
 
 Ninja (disambiguation)
 Warrior (disambiguation)
 Shinobi (disambiguation)
 Kunoichi (disambiguation)